The 2010 Challenge de France Final was the 9th final of France's female cup competition. The final took place on 23 May 2010 at the Stade Robert Bobin in Bondoufle, a commune in the Île-de-France region. The match was contested between Paris Saint-Germain and Montpellier with the latter club coming in as defending champions.  

Paris Saint-Germain captured their first Challenge de France title by defeating Montpellier 5–0. Montpellier were attempting to become the third club to defend their Challenge de France title having already done it once before. The 5–0 scoreline gap is the largest in the cup's young history. It is also the first time in French football history that both the male and female sections of a club occupy both the country's national cups. The male section of Paris Saint-Germain won the Coupe de France on 1 May.

Match

Details

External links
 Challenge de France FFF Page

Chall
2010
May 2010 sports events in France
Sport in Essonne